Clams are saltwater or freshwater mollusks that have two hinged shells.

Clam may also refer to:
 Clam AntiVirus, a free antivirus program
 Clam, Charente-Maritime, a commune in the Charente-Maritime département, in France
 Clam, Virginia, US, an unincorporated community
 Clam (Camp Lazlo), a fictional character in the animated television series Camp Lazlo
 CLAM (C++ Library for Audio and Music), a software framework for audio data processing
 CLaMS (Chemical Lagrangian Model of the Stratosphere), a modular chemistry transport model system
 "Clams" (SpongeBob SquarePants), an episode of the animated television series SpongeBob SquarePants
 Clement Attlee (1883–1967), nicknamed "Clam"
 A member or constituent group of the Clamshell Alliance, an American anti-nuclear activist group

See also
 KLAM, a radio station